Stanisław Żelichowski (born 9 April 1944 in Księżostany) is a Polish politician. He was elected to Sejm on 25 September 2005, getting 3532 votes in 34 Elbląg district as a candidate from the Polish People's Party list.

He was also a member of People's Republic of Poland Sejm 1985-1989, Sejm 1991-1993, Sejm 1993-1997, Sejm 1997-2001, and Sejm 2001-2005.

See also
Members of Polish Sejm 2005-2007

External links
Stanisław Żelichowski - parliamentary page - includes declarations of interest, voting record, and transcripts of speeches.

Members of the Polish Sejm 2005–2007
Members of the Polish Sejm 1991–1993
Members of the Polish Sejm 1993–1997
Members of the Polish Sejm 1997–2001
Members of the Polish Sejm 2001–2005
Polish People's Party politicians
1944 births
Living people
Government ministers of Poland
People from Zamość County
Members of the Polish Sejm 2007–2011
Members of the Polish Sejm 2011–2015